Unmesh Bhaiyyasaheb Patil  is an Indian politician. He was elected to the Lok Sabha, lower house of the Parliament of India from Jalgaon, Maharashtra in the 2019 Indian general election as a member of the Bharatiya Janata Party.

References

External links
  Official biographical sketch in Parliament of India website

India MPs 2019–present
Lok Sabha members from Maharashtra
Living people
Bharatiya Janata Party politicians from Maharashtra
1978 births
People from Jalgaon